Sir Frederick Alexis Eaton (20 January 1838 – 10 September 1913) was a British writer and editor. He was Secretary and chronicler of the Royal Academy, and a medievalist.

References

1838 births
1913 deaths
British medievalists